Khakee: The Bihar Chapter is an Indian crime thriller streaming television series created and written by Neeraj Pandey. Produced by Shital Bhatia, under Friday Storytellers. It stars Karan Tacker, Avinash Tiwary, Abhimanyu Singh, Jatin Sarna, Ravi Kishan, Ashutosh Rana, Nikita Dutta, Aishwarya Sushmita, Anup Soni, Shraddha Das, Neeraj Kashyap and Bharat Jha.

The series premiered on Netflix on 25 November 2022.

Plot 
This series is based in Sheikhpura district, Nalanda district and Patna district. Chandan Mahato, who was actually Pintu Mahato in real life, is a member of Ashok Mahto gang, which has been active in Nalanda and Sheikhpura for many years. The story is about how Sheikhpura IPS Amit Lodha brings the Ashok Mahto gang to justice, while navigating his own personal issues.

Cast 
 Karan Tacker as SP Amit Lodha IPS
 Avinash Tiwary as Chandan Mahto
 Abhimanyu Singh as SHO Ranjan Kumar
 Aditi Singh as Ruby Kumari, Sahu's Girlfriend
 Jatin Sarna as Dilip “Chawanprash” Sahu
 Ravi Kishan as Abhyuday Singh
 Ashutosh Rana as IG Mukteshwar Chaubey IPS
 Nikita Dutta as Tanu Lodha, Amit's wife
 Aishwarya Sushmita as Meeta Devi, Sahu's wife
 Neeraj Kashyap as Constable Shiv Ram
 Anup Soni as DIG Sudhir Paswan
 Shraddha Das as Saumya Mukherjee
 Amit Anand Raut
 Kali Prasad Mukherjee as Ravinder Mukhiya
 Vinay Pathak as Sri Ujjiyaar Prasad, former CM of Bihar
 Naval Shukla as Sri Sarvesh Kumar, CM of Bihar
 Sanjay Pandey as SHO Kanhaiya Bharadwaj 
 Susheel Singh as Bharat “Bharta” Yadav
 Bharat Jha as SI Ajit Kumar
 Vijay Kumar Dogra as Jaiswal
 Meenakshi Chugh as DGP’wife

Episodes

Production

Development 
The series was announced in October 2022, and teaser of the series was released on 28 October 2022. The official trailer was released on 05 November 2022.

Casting 
Karan Tacker was cast in the titular role, and was joined by Avinash Tiwary as the other lead.

See also 
 List of Netflix India originals
 List of Netflix original programming
 Maharani (web series)

References

External links 
 
 

2022 web series debuts
2022 Indian television series debuts
Indian drama web series
Hindi-language Netflix original programming